Gaelle Valcke (born 20 February 1986) is a Belgian field hockey player. At the 2012 Summer Olympics she competed with the Belgium women's national field hockey team in the women's tournament.

References

External links 
 

Living people
1986 births
Field hockey players at the 2012 Summer Olympics
Olympic field hockey players of Belgium
Belgian female field hockey players

People from Uccle
Field hockey players from Brussels